Pediasia subflavellus is a species of moth in the family Crambidae described by Philogène Auguste Joseph Duponchel in 1836. It is found on Corsica.

References

Moths described in 1836
Crambini
Moths of Europe